Raja Ram (born Ronald Rothfield, 18 December 1940) is an Australian-born musician and the owner of the United Kingdom record label Tip World. He was a founding member of the psychedelic rock band Quintessence in the late 1960s and early 1970s, playing at the first two Glastonbury Fayres in 1970 and 1971. He later found success in the psychedelic trance scene and continues to headline at large events worldwide.

Early life
Ram left Australia in the 1950s to begin the hippie trail. He returned to Australia later and studied flute at the Melbourne Conservatorium of Music. Ram travelled to New York in 1965 to study jazz, leading to his career as a psychedelic musician. Ram retired from Quintessence in the 1970s for personal reasons and became an envelope salesman.

Ram later returned to his music career, finding success in the emerging genre of electronic music. He was one of the first people to make what is today considered psychedelic trance.

Career
Raja Ram formed The Infinity Project in 1994 with Graham Wood and Ian St. Paul. The first TIP Records track was celebrated by throwing the first of the "TIP parties." Some of the first tracks were produced of Martin Freeland of Man With No Name fame. Richard Bloor then joined them and together they made TIP one of the best-known Goa trance labels. 
 
Aside from The Infinity Project, Ram created Shpongle with Simon Posford and collaborated with a group of Goa musicians to make two ambient albums as The Mystery of the Yeti. He is a founder of 1200 Micrograms along with Riktam, Bansi and Chicago. He often plays the flute on both ambient and full on tracks and has played as guest flautist with Youth, Boy George and Sly & Robbie. He also has collaborated in The Zap! and Cyberbabas with Benji Vaughan.

Ram is married to Nita Devi, with whom he has a daughter named Sastra. He also has a granddaughter named Bella.

Projects
 Quintessence
 The Infinity Project
 Shpongle
 The Mystery of the Yeti
 1200 Micrograms
 The Zap!
 Cyberbabas
 Omputer
 DMT
 Tipnotic
 Visible Sound

Discography

Raja Ram's Stash Bag (2002)
Raja Ram's Stash Bag Volume 2 (2003)
Raja Ram's Stash Bag Vol. 3 – Smokers Jokers and Midnight Tokers (2004)
Raja Ram's Stash Bag Vol. 3 – Smokers Jokers and Midnight Tokers (Unmixed Edition) (2004)
Most Wanted Presents: Raja Ram the Godfather (2005)
Evolution of Expanded Consciousness (2006)
Raja Ram's Stash Bag Volume 4 (2006)
The Anthology (2007)
Raja Ram's Pipe Dreams (2013)
Raja Ram's Pipe Dreams 2 (2013)
Raja Ram's Stash Bag Volume 5 (2014)
Raja Ram's Stash Bag Vol. 6 (2018)

References

External links
TIP Records

1941 births
Living people
Australian electronic musicians
Australian expatriates in the United Kingdom
Australian expatriates in the United States
Australian flautists
Musicians from Melbourne
Psychedelic trance musicians
Australian people of Indian descent